Vasada (Ouasada) was a city of ancient Lycaonia and later of Isauria, Asia Minor (modern Turkey). It was located a little to the southwest of Laodiceia. In the acta of church councils attended by its bishop, the name appears variously as Usada or Ousada (Οὔσαδα) or Aasada (Ἀάσαδα).

Its site is located near Bostandere, Konya Province, Asiatic Turkey.

Residential see 
Vasada, identified with the ruins on Mount Kestel Dağ near modern Seydişehir, was important enough in the Roman province of Lycaonia to become a suffragan of the Metropolis of Iconium, under the Patriarchate of Constantinople.

These bishops were historically documented :
 Theodorus, attended the First Council of Nicaea in 325. 
 Le Quien counts a bishop Severus, contemporary of Saint Basilius
 Olympius, attended the Council of Chalcedon in 451
 Gorgonius partook in the Council of Constantinople of 536
 Conone participated in the Council in Trullo in 692
 At the Council of Constantinople of 879-880 which rehabilitated Patriarch Photius, Le Quien notes both Nicephorus and Nicolaus, supporters of (and appointed by?) rival Patriarchs Photius viz. Ignatius I.

Catholic titular see 
The diocese was nominally restored in 1929 by the Roman Catholic Church as the titular bishopric of Vasada.

It is vacant since decades, having had the following incumbents:
 Joseph James Byrne, Holy Ghost Fathers (C.S.Sp.) (Irish) (1932.11.29 – 1953.03.25) as last Apostolic Vicar of Kilima-Njaro (Tanzania) (1932.11.29 – 1953.03.25); next (see) renamed and promoted first Bishop of Moshi (Tanzania) (1953.03.25 – 1959.05.15), emeritate as Titular Bishop of Abaradira (1959.05.15 – death 1961.10.20)
 Johann Wember, Congregation of Missionaries of the Holy Family (M.S.F.) (German) (1955.02.18 – death 1980.05.04) as first Apostolic Vicar of Northern Norway (Norway) (1955.02.18 – 1976) and on emeritate; previously last Ecclesiastical Superior of Missionary District of Northern Norway (Norway) (1939.11.17 – 1944.03.10), (see) promoted as the only Apostolic Prefect of Northern Norway (1944.03.10 – 1955.02.18).

Notes

Sources and external links 
 GCatholic 
 
 Pius Bonifacius Gams, Series episcoporum Ecclesiae Catholicae, Leipzig 1931, p. 451
 
 Raymond Janin, lemma 1. 'Basada', in Dictionnaire d'Histoire et de Géographie ecclésiastiques, vol. VI, 1932, col. 1063

Populated places in ancient Lycaonia
Populated places in ancient Isauria
Catholic titular sees in Asia
Defunct dioceses of the Ecumenical Patriarchate of Constantinople
Populated places of the Byzantine Empire
Roman towns and cities in Turkey
Former populated places in Turkey
History of Konya Province